Rice has religious significance and spiritual heritage in India, and is considered a sacred grain in Hindu scriptures such as Vedas, Atharvaveda, Taittirīya Brāhmaṇa, Shatapatha Brahmana, the Mahabharata epic, and in archaeological finds in places such as the holy city of Kashi.

It is used in various religious life rites of passage in India such as: dry rice with 'akshata' smeared with red vermilion; nāmakaraṇa – naming ceremony of the new born child; annaprashana – a ritualistic first feeding of a child; as a 'havis' offering of cooked rice to the sacrificial fire in Yagna kund; and in the Mahabharata epic.

In Tamil Nadu, it is worshipped as Ponni Amman. In Manipur, in northeastern India, rice cultivation rites form an important part in the life of the farmer. The largest harvest festivals in the country are inextricably linked to the time when rice is harvested; invariably held during mid January. These festivals are Bihu in Assam, Pongal in Tamil Nadu,  Makara Sankranthi in Karnataka and in northern and western states of India.

History

Rice is a sacred grain in India with the ancient scripture Vedas referring to it as simply 'annam', meaning food, represents Prajapati or Janardana, as it is one of the earliest cereals known to humanity, and thus, is held in great reverence and is used in most religious activities of Hindus. In ancient days of the Vedic period, as reported by a reputed Indian scientist called Dr, Richaria, there were 40,000 varieties of rice in the country out of which 20,000 varieties are reportedly available even todate in India. The state of Chhattisgarh alone is stated to have 20,000 types.

Atharvaveda defines rice as the "sons of heaven who never die". According to Taittirīya Brāhmaṇa, the god of rice is called Annadevata, the ancestor of the sacrifice, and also admonishes people not decry the role of rice. Shatapatha Brahmana says rice emerged from the body of Indra, and further elaborates: "[f]rom his marrow his drink, the soma juice flowed, and became rice: in this way his energies, or vital power, went from  him". Hindu goddesses Annapoorna and Lakshmi (goddess of wealth), and the combination of the two goddesses called AnnaLakshmi represents rice; Dhanya Lakshmi is another name for the goddess who is depicted with a few sheaves of paddy in her hand. In the Mahabharata epic, Krishna gifted a vessel to Draupadi which would always be filled with rice and hence the vessel is named Akshaya Patra. Archaeological findings indicate that rice was first cultivated in the region around the holy city of Kashi.

Religious uses

Rice grains are used in the form of blessings as 'akshata'. Dry rice is smeared with red vermilion and  applied on the forehead of persons as it is said to bestow favourable characteristics. It is one of the Navadanya, nine sacred grains used in sacred ceremonies. During Hindu religious ceremonies, another use of rice is as a 'havis' offering of cooked rice to the sacrificial fire in Yagna kund, propitiating gods. Rice smeared with turmeric powder is sprinkled over worshippers and the newly married couple as a blessing. Only rice can form the base 'Aasanam' or seat for placing the sacred Kalasha (pot) upon it during religious celebrations. In certain regions of India, the bride and bridegroom stand on a heap of rice during the marriage ceremony. Also, in many states of India, when a bride enters her husband's house, she is made to first push with her right foot a small metal jar or vessel of rice; this symbolises that with the spilled rice, she would usher prosperity to her newly adopted house/family.

Rice is also used in the life rite of nāmakaraṇa, the naming ceremony of the new born child, which is done by writing the name on a plate filled with paddy or rice. An important Hindu rite of passage performed within the first six or seven months of an infant's life is called Annaprashana when cooked rice duly squashed or sweet rice pudding called Kheer is fed to the child amdist chanting of hymns.  When priests or elders of the family bless their kin, they wish that their life be full of dhan (wealth) and dhanya (rice). In some communities in South India, the bride and the groom, during the wedding, pour rice in  heaps on each other signifying wealth and happiness of progeny.

In Tamil Nadu, Ponni Amman is the rice goddess who is worshiped in some regions of the state during July–August. Legend says that prayers by farmers to Ponni Amman saved paddy crop from devastation by floods and following this farmers erected a statue in her honour.

In the Northestern state of Manipur, the farmer's agricultrual operations for rice cultivation starts with a ritual called Loutaba. This ritual is performed to the gods in which a fistful of “rice with flowers, eight Burma agrimony (Eupatorium birmanicum) buds, and sweets” are offered to gods with the prayer that the yield should be much better than the previous year. The Chengluk lubak kaiba rite on the wedding day is when the bridegroom brings a basket of rice to the bride's house.

In funeral rites for the deceased person in diverse forms. Dry rice or sodden rice is placed at or near the mouth of the dead body by ladies and all relatives of the dead person, which is a rite generally done before taking the body to the crematorium.Cooked rice in white colour is also used to denote pure soul

Festivals

The biggest harvest festivals in India are linked to the time when rice is harvested; invariably held during mid January. Bihu in Assam, Pongal in Tamil Nadu, Makara Sankranthi in Karnataka and in northern and western states of India are all festivals where newly harvested rice is offered to the gods amidst lots fanfare that stretches over 2–4 days. On the Pongal festival day, in Tamil Nadu at dawn the ritual observed is of preparing a dish in a mud pot by boiling rice, milk and jaggery till the preparation boils over. It is called Sakkara pongal in Tamil language and the ritual portends wealth and happiness. There are also smaller festivals linked to pre-sowing, sowing, pre-transplanting, transplanting, invoking the rain gods, protecting and pre-harvesting. Pongal was the biggest and still the most celebrated festival in India. It is also called as Thai/Tai Pongal, which is a four days festival and is dedicated to the Sun god and corresponds to Makara Sankranthi. On the day of Makara Sankranthi, cows and bullocks are washed and beautifully decorated, clothed, horns painted, decked with flowers and fed with Pongal recognising their total involvement in the agricultural process of giving milk and tilling the land.

Among the Meitie people of Manipur, rice is considered a 'magico-religious' offering used during festivals to dispel spirits or ghosts from their homes. It is offered to the clan deity and on a variety of other festive events. The 'Chengluk lubak kaiba' is a custom on the wedding day when the bridegroom brings a basket of rice to the bride's house. Meiteis also make a food offering of rice to their ancestors during September–October for fifteen days after the full moon day.

In Coorg district in Karnataka, a festival called the Huttari festival with 'pudda ari' is celebrated during the rice harvest season, during January, with great fervour. There is no Brahmin interference at the time as the celebration which held for a number of days after tasting fresh rice includes consumption of brandy and pork, widely as part of the celebrations.

References

Rice production in India
Hindu culture